"First of His Name" is the fifth episode of the fourth season of HBO's medieval fantasy television series Game of Thrones. The 35th episode overall, it was written by series co-creators David Benioff and D. B. Weiss, and directed by Michelle MacLaren. It aired on May 4, 2014.

In the episode, Tommen Baratheon is crowned as the new king of the Seven Kingdoms; Petyr "Littlefinger" Baelish and Sansa Stark arrive at the Eyrie and are welcomed by Lysa Arryn; Daenerys Targaryen decides to stay in Meereen; and Jon Snow leads an attack on the Night's Watch mutineers at Craster's Keep. The title of the episode refers to a phrase used during Tommen Baratheon's coronation, as "King Tommen of the House Baratheon, First of His Name". The episode received critical acclaim and set a new viewership record, where it was seen by 7.16 million viewers during its initial airing in the United States.

Plot

In King's Landing
Tommen is crowned as king, the first of his name and Cersei decides that he will soon marry Margaery. Tywin tells Cersei that the gold mines in the Westerlands ran dry years ago and that they are deeply indebted to the Iron Bank, but the union of the houses of Lannister and Tyrell will help rectify this problem. Cersei asks Oberyn to send a ship back to Sunspear as a gift for Myrcella.

In the Vale
Petyr and Sansa arrive in the Vale. At the Bloody Gate, Petyr tells the guards that Sansa is his niece Elaine. Lysa reveals that she poisoned her husband at Petyr's instigation before the two are hurriedly married. She also suspects that Petyr was intimate with Sansa, and says that when Tyrion dies she will marry Robin.

In Meereen
Daario tells Daenerys that his forces have confiscated the 93-ship Meereenese navy. Jorah tells her that Joffrey perished and that both Astapor and Yunkai have reverted to slavery. Daenerys tells Jorah that instead of sailing west, she intends to stay and rule her new people herself.

On the Kingsroad
As Brienne and Podrick ride north, she is surprised by his lack of outdoor skills.

In the Riverlands
Arya reveals to the Hound that Syrio was killed by Meryn.

Beyond the Wall
Jon's group attacks Craster's Keep. Locke covertly tries to kidnap Bran, but Bran enters Hodor's mind and kills Locke. Freed, Bran contemplates reuniting with Jon, but Jojen tells him that Jon will prevent their journey. After killing Karl and being reunited with Ghost, Jon burns the keep, at the suggestion of Craster's daughter-wives.

Production

Writing

"First of His Name" was written by executive producers David Benioff and D. B. Weiss, based upon the source material, Martin's A Storm of Swords. Chapters adapted from A Storm of Swords to the episode were chapters 68 and 71 (Sansa VI and Daenerys VI). It also covers part of the fourth novel, A Feast for Crows: namely chapter 14 (Brienne III).

Casting
Kate Dickie (Lysa Arryn) and Lino Facioli (Robin Arryn) make return appearances after an absence of several years (since the first season).

Reception

Ratings
"First of His Name" established a new series high in ratings, with 7.16 million people watching it during its first airing. In the United Kingdom, the episode was viewed by 1.643 million viewers, making it the highest-rated broadcast that week. It also received 0.082 million timeshift viewers.

Critical reception
The episode received universal acclaim from critics. Rotten Tomatoes reported that 100% of the episode's 40 reviews on the site were positive with an average score of 8.25 out of 10. Its consensus reads: "Only slow by Game of Thrones standards, "First of His Name" demonstrates how carefully constructed this show has been since season one." Matt Fowler of IGN gave the episode a 9/10 writing that the episode "gave us a much-needed look back at some past events on the series." He highlighted the revelation that Littlefinger's actions "put the story of the entire series into motion." Erik Adams of The A.V. Club gave the episode an A and praised the writers for their focus on the female characters.

References

External links

  at HBO.com
 

2014 American television episodes
Game of Thrones (season 4) episodes
Television episodes written by David Benioff and D. B. Weiss